Virginia Reh grew up in New York City and studied dramatic arts in Berkeley, California. She joined the faculty of Dramatic Arts at Brock University from a professional career as an actor, director, dramaturg and coach, working in theatre, opera and film and television. For 13 years she taught part-time at Brock and officially became full-time in 2006, teaching acting, directing and voice. Her vocal work includes directing all the voices for the last 76 episodes of Sailor Moon that were dubbed into English. She has directed Ring Round the Moon, Marat/Sade, A Little Night Music, Phedre, Orpheus Descending, and The Blue Room for mainstage DART productions. She has worked professionally with Opera In Concert, Toronto Operetta Theatre and Tapestry New Opera. Reh was founding co-director of Script Lab, developing plays, musicals and film scripts. She was artistic director of the Gryphon Theatre. For many years Reh was acting coach and production manager to the Canadian Children's Opera Chorus. In 1994, Reh received the Theatre Ontario's Maggie Bassett award for outstanding contribution to theatre in Ontario. Reh organized a national conference, Lyric Canada 2010, bringing together the creators and scholars of Canadian music theatre and opera. Reh was an Ontario councillor for the Canadian Actors' Equity Association and secretary/treasurer of the executive through 2012. In the course of nine years at Brock she directed seven main stage.

Early life
Reh began acting at a young age with the Emerson Players, a community theatre company based out of the unitarian church which she participated in with her parents in New York. She attended the University of Berkeley as a French major but soon transitioned to Dramatic Arts major after her first audition. In her studies at Berkeley, it was required for her to take directing courses for her masters, which then lead her to the Scholar Director PHD program. She dropped out of the PHD program so that she could pursue acting in a small theatre company in California. The company did not have enough directors, so she volunteered. She started directing seriously in the early 1980s, at a time when a movement of women playwrights and directors was beginning.

Selected Theatre Work: Acting
 Richard III: Queen Margaret/Edward IV. Shakespeare in the Square (Director: Scott Lale) August, 2005
 The Foreigner: Betty Meeks. Theatre on the Grand (Director: Virginia Reh)
 The Last of the Red Hot Lovers: Jeanette. Theatre on the Grand (Director: Joan Howell)
 Chapter Two: Jenny Malone. Gryphon Theatre (Director: Robert Buck)
 Private Lives: Amanda Prynne. Colonnade Theatre (Director: Peter Peroff)
 Lady Windermere's Fan: Lady Windermere. Colonnade Theatre (Director: Peter Peroff)
 The Apple Cart: Princess Royal. Shaw Festival (Director: Noel Williams)
 The Admirable Crichton: Mlle. Jeanne. Shaw Festival (Director: Barry Morse)
 The Importance of Being Earnest: Cecily Cardew. Colonnade Theatre (Director: David Moulday)
 School for Scandal: Lady Teazle. Colonnade Theatre (Director: Peter Peroff)

Selected Theatre Work: Directing for young audiences 
 La Sante c'est pas sorcier, Waterloo Productions, Ontario Tours 1986-1988
 Il Drago di Energio (Conserving Kingdom), Waterwood Productions/Ministry of Energy 1987
 I'm Never Growin' Up (Lukasiewicz & Reynolds), Aladdin Theatre at the Limelight, Toronto 1987
 Which Witch is which? (McMaster), Aladdin Theatre at the Limelight, Toronto 1987
 Fox of a Thousand facts (Campbell), Colonnade Theatre, Toronto, September 1974

Selected Theatre Work: Directing 
 Noises Off, Theatre Sarnia 2003
 Joseph and the Amazing Technicolor Dreamcoat, Yorkminstrels, 2001, remounted in 2002
 Anything Goes, Yorkminstrels, Leah Posluns Theatre, Toronto 1998
 Pirates of Penzance, Victorian Operetta Society, Cobourg, 1995
 Grand Hotel, Etobicoke Musical Productions, Toronto 1995
 A Midsummer Night's Dream, Markham Theatre, 1993
 The Gipsy Princess, Scugog Choral Society, Port Perry, November 1992
 Albertine in Five Times, The Oakville Players, Oakville, November 1991
 Man of La Mancha, Glen Productions, Cornwall, 1990
 Jesus Christ Superstar, Burlington Light Opera, 1989
 Show Boat, Etobicoke Musical Productions, April 1988
 The Threepenny Opera, McMaster Music Theatre, Hamilton 1984
 The House of Bernarda Alba, Alumnae Theatre, Toronto 1980

Selected Film/Television 
 A Home at the End of the World - Warner Bros./ Michael Mayer, with Colin Farrel and Sissy Spacek
 My Sisters' Keeper - Power Productions/ABC/Bill Norton
 Side Effects - CBC/Brad Turner
 Mafia Princess - NBC Movie of the Week/Bob Collins with Tony Curtis

References

American stage actresses
Academic staff of Brock University
Living people
University of California, Berkeley alumni
Year of birth missing (living people)
American theatre directors
Women theatre directors
American women academics
21st-century American women